Africanist may refer to:
Africanist (Spain), people who encouraged a strong involvement of the Kingdom of Spain in Colonial Africa
A specialist in African studies
Pan-Africanism, aims to encourage solidarity among people of African descent
A strand of African nationalism and activism against apartheid in South Africa associated with the Pan Africanist Congress
A literary theory developed by author and critic Toni Morrison in her book Playing in the Dark